Li Jingjing may refer to:

 Li Jingjing (canoeist)
 Li Jingjing (rower)